Pukará de Quitor (also spelled Pucará de Quitor)  (Quechua pukara fortress) is a pre-Columbian archaeological site in northern Chile. This stone fortress is located 3 km northwest of the town of San Pedro de Atacama, overlooking the valley of the river San Pedro. It was designated a national monument in 1982.

References

 Pukará de Quitor

Buildings and structures in Antofagasta Region
Tourist attractions in Antofagasta Region
National Monuments of Chile
Pre-Columbian fortifications in Chile